The  is a DC electric multiple unit (EMU) train type operated by the private railway operator Kumamoto Electric Railway in Japan, since 16 March 2015.

Design
The two-car trains were rebuilt from 2015 from former Tokyo Metro 01 series six-car trains, by adding two single-arm pantographs and new KW206 "efWing" carbon-reinforced plastic  bogies built by Kawasaki Heavy Industries.

Formations
 two two-car sets (numbers 35 and 36) are in operation, formed as follows with one motored car ("Mc") and one non-powered trailer car ("Tc").

The Mc cars have two single-arm pantographs.

Interior
Passenger accommodation consists of longitudinal bench seating.

History
Former Tokyo Metro 01 series driving cars 01-136 and 01-636 were sold to the Kumamoto Electric Railway in February 2015. The modified two-car set entered service on 16 March 2015. Two more cars, 01-135 and 01-635, were acquired during fiscal 2015.

References

External links

Electric multiple units of Japan
Train-related introductions in 2015
600 V DC multiple units
Kawasaki multiple units
Nippon Sharyo multiple units
Kinki Sharyo multiple units
Tokyu Car multiple units